Herber Omar Mejia "Junior" Flores (born March 26, 1996) is an American soccer player who currently is a free agent.

Early life
Junior Flores was born in Los Angeles, California to Salvadoran parents, before moving to Manassas Park, Virginia when he was a child. He attended Manassas Park High School and, as a freshman, led the school to the Group A state title. During his youth, he played for the LMVSC Hawks, coached by Paul Ngend. He then went to the McLean Youth Soccer Club in McLean, Virginia. Before he was able to play for them, IMG Academy Bradenton invited Flores to join their program. After his performance in the 2011 Nike International Friendlies tournament, where the 15-year-old Flores had one assist vs. France, two assists vs. Brazil and scored the game-winning goal vs. Turkey, Flores received offers from many MLS clubs, as well as offers from abroad. Paris Saint-Germain and Liverpool were among several European clubs interested in Flores, but ultimately, he signed with Borussia Dortmund in a four-year contract effective once Flores turned 18.

International
Flores has played for both the United States U17 and the United States U20 national teams.

References

External links
 

American soccer players
1996 births
American sportspeople of Salvadoran descent
American expatriate soccer players
American expatriate soccer players in Germany
People from Prince William County, Virginia
Living people
Borussia Dortmund II players
Association football midfielders
Soccer players from Virginia
3. Liga players
Regionalliga players
United States men's youth international soccer players
United States men's under-20 international soccer players
2015 CONCACAF U-20 Championship players